Narasaraopet revenue division is an administrative division in the Palnadu district of the Indian state of Andhra Pradesh. It comprises 9 mandals and is one of the three revenue divisions in the district, along with Gurajala and Sattenapalli. Narasaraopet serves as the headquarters of the division.

Administration 

The mandals in the revenue division are:

See also 
List of revenue divisions in Andhra Pradesh

References 

Revenue divisions in Guntur district